Cease is a surname. Notable people with the surname include:

Daniel L. Cease (died 1928), American magazine editor
Dylan Cease (born 1995), American baseball player
Jane Cease (born 1936), American politician
Jeff Cease (born 1967), American musician
Kyle Cease (born 1977), American actor
Lil' Cease (born 1978), American rapper